The 1979 XV FIBA International Christmas Tournament "Trofeo Raimundo Saporta" was the 15th edition of the FIBA International Christmas Tournament. It took place at Sports City of Real Madrid Pavilion, Madrid, Spain, on 24, 25 and 26 December 1979 with the participations of Spanish club sides Real Madrid and Joventut Freixenet, a Soviet Union senior national team, and an American AiA amateur team.

League stage

Day 1, December 24, 1979

|}

Day 2, December 25, 1979

|}

Day 3, December 26, 1979

|}

Final standings

References

1979–80 in European basketball
1979–80 in Spanish basketball